The Mal is a Hindu caste found in the state of West Bengal and Jharkhand.

Mal and Malla are derived from the Sanskrit word malla, meaning wrestler.

Paharia Mal or Mal Paharia is considered as Scheduled Tribe while the other Mal groups are considered as Scheduled Castes by the Government of West Bengal.

Demographics
Mal numbered 273,641 in the 2001 census and were 1.5 per cent of the total Scheduled Caste population of West Bengal. 39.6 per cent of the Mal were literate - 51.9 per cent males and 26.8 per cent females were literate.

Divisions
Raja Mals were rulers of Bengal-Jharkhand junction area. Chatradhari Mals were supposed to be ministers of Raja Mals. Sapure Mals are mainly snake charmers. Paharia Mals generally live in hilly areas, and have their own distinct language. Raja Mals do not practice widow marriage like other orthodox Hindus.

See also
Mal Muslim

References 

 

Hindu surnames
Social groups of West Bengal
Indian castes
Bengali Hindu castes